"Djadja" is a song by Malian singer Aya Nakamura, released on April 6, 2018, as the lead single off her second studio album Nakamura (2018). It reached number one in France, the Netherlands and Romania.

In June 2020, she released a new remix featuring Maluma adding new lyrics in Spanish. In November 2020, they performed the remix live for the MTV Europe Music Awards from separate places due to the COVID-19 restrictions.

Charts

Weekly charts

Year-end charts

Certifications

See also
 List of Airplay 100 number ones of the 2010s

References

2018 singles
2018 songs
2020 singles
Aya Nakamura songs
French-language songs
Maluma songs
Macaronic songs
Number-one singles in Romania
Dutch Top 40 number-one singles
Songs written by Aya Nakamura